The number 488 may refer to any of several things:
The year 488.
The year 488 BC
British Rail Class 488, unpowered electric multiple unit trailer sets, converted from Mark 2F coaches
Ferrari 488, a mid-engined sports car
IEEE-488, a short-range, digital communications bus specification
488 Kreusa, a minor planet orbiting the Sun
Nevada State Route 488
New York State Route 488
No. 488 Squadron RNZAF
Unterseeboot 488 (U-488), a Type XIV U-boat ("Milchkuh") of the Kriegsmarine
USS McCalla (DD-488), a Gleaves-class destroyer
USS Sarda (SS-488), a Tench-class submarine